Marion Bay is a small township in the Australian state of South Australia at the southern tip of the Yorke Peninsula.  At the 2016 census, Marion Bay had a population of 172. Historically, it formed part of Narungga lands.

Description
It is surrounded by beaches and is the gateway to the Dhilba Guuranda–Innes National Park. The close proximity of the beach and cliffs have popularized Marion Bay as a fishing destination, with Brown Beach in the nearby Innes National Park being particularly famous among recreational fisherman as a picturesque fishing destination.

Water supply
In 2008, a desalination plant was commissioned to meet the water demands of the summer tourist season. A 60 kL/d sea water reverse osmosis plant now supplies the local caravan park, residents and businesses. The plant was commissioned in response to declining bore water quality and associated problems of corrosion.  The plant was designed and constructed by Osmoflo.

Governance
Marion Bay is located within the federal Division of Grey, the state electoral district of Narungga and the local government area known as the Yorke Peninsula Council.

In popular culture
Marion Bay features in Tricia Stringer's 2020 novel The family inheritance.

See also
List of cities and towns in South Australia
Warrenben Conservation Park

Notes and references

External links

  Yorke Peninsula website
  Yorke Peninsula: Marion Bay

Yorke Peninsula
Coastal towns in South Australia
Bays of South Australia
1872 establishments in Australia
Investigator Strait
Beaches of South Australia